Makiyama (written: 牧山) is a Japanese surname. Notable people with the name include:

, Japanese politician
, Japanese archer
Thomas H. Makiyama (1928–2005), American aikidoka

See also
Makiyama Station, a railway station in Okayama, Okayama Prefecture, Japan
Hosuk Lee-Makiyama, Swedish diplomat

Japanese-language surnames